Eddie Jackson is the name of:

Eddie Jackson (chef) (born 1980), American NFL safety and Food Network host
Eddie Jackson (safety) (born 1993), American football player for the Chicago Bears
Edward Jackson (footballer) (1925–1996), Australian rules footballer who played with Melbourne in the Victorian Football League
Eddie Jackson (musician) (born 1961), American bassist from Queensrÿche
Eddie Jackson (singer) (1926–2002), American country and rockabilly singer
Eddie Lee Jackson (1949–2020), American politician; Democratic member of the Illinois House of Representatives
Eddie Jackson (vaudeville) (1896–1980), American vaudeville and Broadway performer

See also 
Edward Jackson (disambiguation)
Edwin Jackson (disambiguation)